The Party Scene is the debut studio album by American rock band All Time Low, released on July 19, 2005 via regional imprint Emerald Moon Records. Music videos were released for "Circles" and "The Girl's a Straight-Up Hustler". Tracks 2, 3, 8, 9 and 12 were re-recorded for the band's next EP, Put Up or Shut Up.

Track listing
All music and arrangements by All Time Low; except where noted. All lyrics by Alex Gaskarth. Additional arrangements by Paul Leavitt.

Personnel
Personnel per booklet.

All Time Low
 Alex Gaskarth – lead vocals, rhythm guitar
 Rian Dawson – drums 
 Zack Merrick – bass, backing vocals
 Jack Barakat – lead guitar

Additional musicians
 Alex Gaskarth and Paul Leavitt – piano, synths, strings, percussion, effects
 Matt Parsons of Silent Film – additional vocals on "The Girl's a Straight-Up Hustler"

Production
 Paul Leavitt – producer, mixing, engineering
 Alan Douches – mastering
 Mario Garza of Robot Plague – CD layout/design

References

All Time Low albums
2005 debut albums